Bengt "Falan" Fahlqvist (15 April 1922 – 7 March 2004) was a Swedish wrestler who competed at the 1948 and 1952 Summer Olympics. He won a bronze medal in the freestyle light-heavyweight division in 1948 and finished sixth as a Greco-Roman heavyweight in 1952. He won the European freestyle title in 1946 by beating Fritz Stöckli in the final, but lost to Stöckli in the Olympic semifinal in 1948.

References

External links
 

1922 births
2004 deaths
Olympic wrestlers of Sweden
Wrestlers at the 1948 Summer Olympics
Wrestlers at the 1952 Summer Olympics
Swedish male sport wrestlers
Olympic bronze medalists for Sweden
Olympic medalists in wrestling
Medalists at the 1948 Summer Olympics